Derry Herlangga (born 12 July 1995) is an Indonesian professional footballer who played as a full-back for Liga 2 club Putra Delta Sidoarjo.

Career

PS TIRA (TIRA-Persikabo)
In 2018, Derry signed a contract with Indonesian Liga 1 club PS TIRA. He made his league debut on 21 April 2018 against PSM Makassar at the Andi Mattalatta Stadium, Makassar.

Sriwijaya
He was signed for Sriwijaya to play in Liga 2 in the 2020 season. This season was suspended on 27 March 2020 due to the COVID-19 pandemic. The season was abandoned and was declared void on 20 January 2021.

Muba Babel United
In 2021, Derry signed a contract with Indonesian Liga 2 club Muba Babel United. He made his league debut on 6 October 2021 against Sriwijaya at the Gelora Sriwijaya Stadium, Palembang.

Honours

Club
PS TNI U-21
 Indonesia Soccer Championship U-21: 2016
PSMS Medan
 Liga 2 runner-up: 2017

References

External links
 Derry Herlangga at Soccerway
 Derry Herlangga at Liga Indonesia

1995 births
Living people
Indonesian footballers
Sriwijaya F.C. players
Association football defenders
Sportspeople from Jakarta
21st-century Indonesian people